Kim Banta (born January 17, 1964) is an American politician from Kentucky. She is a Republican and represents District 63 in the State House. Banta was first elected in 2019, after she defeated Democratic opponent Josh Blair in a special election.

Political career

Committee assignments 

 Primary & Secondary Ed & Workforce Development (Chair)
 Judiciary
 Licensing, Occupations, & Administrative Regulations
 Appropriations & Revenue

References 

Living people
Republican Party members of the Kentucky House of Representatives
21st-century American politicians
1964 births